Maintirano is a district in western Madagascar. It is a part of Melaky Region and borders the districts of Besalampy in north, Morafenobe in east and Antsalova in south.

Communes
The district is further divided into 14 communes:

 Andabotoka
 Andranovao
 Ankisatra
 Antsahidoha Bebao
 Antsondrodava
 Bebakony Sud
 Berevo-Ranobe
 Betanatanana
 Mafaijijo
 Maintirano
 Marohazo
 Maromavo
 Tambohorano
 Veromanga

References and notes

Districts of Melaky